David Matthews (born 9 April 1974) is an Irish former middle-distance runner specialising in the 800 metres. He was born in Leixlip, County Kildare and attended University College, Dublin.

At his favoured distance, he won the consecutive national titles outdoors in 1994–5–6–7 and indoors in 1993–4–5, He won the bronze medal at the 1993 European Junior Championships, reached the semifinal of the 1996 Olympics and the heats of the 2000 Olympics. Matthews is the Irish record holder at 800m and 1000 m outdoors (senior and under-23).

In 2011, Matthews was appointed fitness coach of senior Cork county hurling team.

Personal bests

References

External links

1974 births
Living people
Alumni of University College Dublin
Athletes (track and field) at the 1996 Summer Olympics
Athletes (track and field) at the 2000 Summer Olympics
Cork county hurling team
Hurling coaches
Irish male middle-distance runners
Olympic athletes of Ireland
People from Leixlip
Sportspeople from County Kildare
World Athletics Championships athletes for Ireland